Spar varnish (occasionally also called boat varnish or yacht varnish) is a wood-finishing varnish, originally developed for coating the spars of sailing ships. These formed part of the masts and rigging, and had to withstand rough condition, being flexed by the wind loads they supported, attacked by sea and bad weather, and suffering from UV degradation from long-term exposure to sunlight.

The most important condition for such varnishes to resist was flexing. This required a varnish that was flexible and elastic. Without elasticity, the varnish would soon crack, allowing water to penetrate to the wood beneath. At the time, varnish production was rudimentary and had only simple materials with which to work. It pre-dated the development of modern polymer chemistry. The original sort of spar varnish was a "short oil" varnish, in which a small proportion of a finishing oil, usually boiled linseed oil, was the majority proportion of the varnish. This gave flexibility, even though its weather resistance was still poor, and thus re-coating was relatively frequently required.

In modern times, "spar varnish" has become a genericised term in North America for any outdoor wood finish. Owing to modern varnish materials, their weather and UV resistance is likely to be good, but the original requirement for flexibility has largely been forgotten.  A common form of modern spar varnish is spar urethane, a polyurethane-based finish intended for outdoor use, where sunlight-, heat-, and water-resistance are desirable qualities.

See also 
 Construction adhesive, a gluing compound for wood and other materials, designed to be more flexible than brittle wood glue

References 

Varnishes
Wood finishing materials